Skagit Station is a multimodal transportation hub in Mount Vernon, Washington, United States served by Amtrak, the US national railroad-passenger system. The facility at 105 East Kincaid Street was built in 2004 to replace the former Amtrak station on 725 College Way, which is currently used by the Burlington Northern and Santa Fe Railroad.

It connects with services provided by Skagit Transit, Whatcom Transportation Authority and Island Transit along with Amtrak and Greyhound. Commuter buses to Everett Station provide onward connection to Sound Transit, Everett Transit and Community Transit services.

Boardings and alightings

References

External links

Mount Vernon Amtrak Station (USA RailGuide - TrainWeb)

Amtrak stations in Washington (state)
Mount Vernon, Washington
Transportation buildings and structures in Skagit County, Washington
2004 establishments in Washington (state)
Railway stations in the United States opened in 2004